Sandeep Nath is Singer, Lyricist, Composer, Screenwriter, Director and Producer in Bollywood.His Sufi songs "Rangrez", "Ishq Niralaaa" are full of philosophy, spirituality, pure love and positivity. He started his literary career as a poet and singer at the age of eighteen. He has completed more than two books as namely "Mujhko Kuch Bhi Naam Doh" (a collection of Hindi poetry), "Darpan Ab Bhi Andha Hai" (a collection of Ghazals). His poetries have been selected in "Kabita Parabasey" an anthology of Bengali poems written by the poets from outside Bengal and published by Bangiya Maitri Samiti Mumbai. He is closely associated with India's fastest growing poetry group "Poets Corner Group" & "Delhi Poetry Festival".  One of his poem was featured in Musings : A Mosaic (anthology by Poets' Corner). In his Indian film career he has written lyrics for more than seventy well known Bollywood films, he is most known for his work in films like 'Madhur Bhandarkar's Page 3 (2005), Corporate (2006), Sanjay Leela Bhansali's Saawariya (2007), Tigmanshu Dhulia's Paan Singh Tomar (film) (2012) and Bullet Raja,  Mohit Suri's Aashiqui 2 (2013) and Rohit Shetty's Singham Returns (2014), Bhushan Patel's ALONE (2015), Vikramjit Singh's Roy (2015), Deepak Tijori's Do lafzon ki kahani (2016), Tigmanshu Dhulia's Raag Desh (2017) & Saheb, Biwi Aur Gangster 3 (2018), and Bhushan Patel's Amavas (2019).

Early life and education
Sandeep Nath was born and brought up in a Bengali family in Uttar Pradesh. Sandeep Nath is a Law graduate. He studied in different cities of Uttar Pradesh India as Allahabad, Kanpur, Moradabad, Dhampur & Chandpur  (Distt.Bijnor). At present Sandeep Nath
lives in Mumbai and his parents live in Kolkata. Sandeep Nath started writing poems at the age of twelve.

Career
Sandeep Nath started journalism during his studies & continued it till date; he wrote more than thousand articles in different newspapers as well as magazines too.

Sandeep Nath worked in editorial department in different newspapers in U.P & Delhi. After that he moved to Mumbai, where he has been working for the last fifteen years.

Sandeep Nath has worked with Bollywood film personalities such as Lata Mangeshkar, Asha Bhosle, Sukhwinder Singh, Shaan, Kunal Ganjawala, Kailash Kher, Shreya Ghoshal, Ram Gopal Varma, Sanjay Leela Bhanshali, Madhur Bhandarkar, Pritam, Monty Sharma, Salim Suleman, Shamir Tandon & many other creative people.

Sandeep Nath has got "Stardust Award" for his outstanding performance as a lyricist for the film Saawariya.

Sandeep has ventured into screen writing too in films and television. Worked for numerous films as this capacity of screenwriter and worked for Afsar Bitiya [Zee TV] and Ek Ghar Banaunga [Star Plus] Hamari Devrani for Star Plus 9 Dulhan Wahi Jo Nanad Mann Bhaye for Mahua Channel as television screenwriter .

The chartbuster 'Sun Raha hai' was penned by Sandeep. With Ankit Tiwari, the team gave another melodious track 'Behki' for Yaara Silly Silly.

Books

1. Mujhko Kuch Bhi Naam Do - A collection of Hindi Poerties ... published on 1997

2. Darpan Ab Bhi Andha Hai - A collection of Hindi Ghazal .... published on 1998

Sandeep's poem has been featured in couple of poetry anthologies(English) by Poets Corner Group listed below

3. Musings: Mosaic - It featured 53 poets in total that includes other big names like Gulzar, Shashi Tharoor, Deepti Naval, Irshad Kamil, Dr.Sukrita Kumar Paul apart from Sandeep.

4. Inklinks - Featured 153 poets in total which include big names like A. P. J. Abdul Kalam, Gulzar, Ruskin Bond, Kapil Sibal, Vikram Seth, Shekhar Kapur, Irshad kamil, etc.

Filmography

 Bhoot (2003)
 Memsaab No 1 (2003)
 Paisa Vasool (2004)
 Ek Hasina Thi (2004)
 Rakht (2004)
 Agnipankh (2004)
 James (2005)
 Sauda The Deal (2005)
 Page 3 (2005)
 Sarkar (2005)
 Corporate (2006)
 Game (2006)
 Madhubala (2006)- Lyrics & Dialogue
 Katputtli (2006)
 Risk (2007)
 Undertrial (2007)
 Saawariya (2007)
 Sarkar Raj (2008)
 Phoonk (2008)
 Fashion (2008)
 Wada Raha (2009)
 Zor Lagaa Ke...Haiya (2009)
 Jail (2009)
 Fox (2009)
 Accident on Hill Road (2009)
 Kandahar (2010)
 Saheb Biwi Aur Gangster (2011)
 I am Singh (2011)
 Naughty @ 40 (2011)
 Ghost (2012)
 Ata Pata Laapata (2012)- Additional Dialogues 
 Sadda Adda (2012)
 Paan Singh Tomar (2012)
 Dee Saturday Night (2013)
 Saheb, Biwi Aur Gangster Returns (2013)
 Aashiqui 2 (2013)
 Bullet Raja (2013)
 Samrat & Co. (2014)
 Singham Returns (2014)
 Ekkees Toppon Ki Salaami (2014)
 Spark—as Dialogue writer (2014)
 Alone (2015)
 Roy (2015)
 Charlie Kay Chakkar Mein (2015)
 Desi Beats—will be released in 2015
 Yaara Silly Silly—will be released in 2015
 Chahe koi mujhe junglee kahe—will be released in 2015
 Dollar (Bollywood movie)—will be released in 2016
 Tezaab 2 -- (2015)
 Do Lafzon Ki Kahani (2016)
 Mirza-Juliet (2017)
 Yaara (2017)
 Raag-Desh (2017)
 Saheb Biwi Aur Gangster 3 (2018)
 Nawabzaade (2018)
 Amavas (2019)
 Hum Hain Bachche Toofani (Single-Original) as Composer & Lyricist
 Mr.Black Mr. White (2019) as Dialogue Writer
 Gabru Gang (2020) as Lyricist & Composer
 DNA Mein Gandhiji (2020) as Writer & Director
 Mandali (2020)
 Rangrez (Single-Original) (2020) as Singer,Composer & Lyricist
 Ishq Niralaa (Single-Original) (2021) as Singer,Composer & Lyricist
 Mere Tukde (Single-Original) (2021) as Singer,Composer & Lyricist

Awards and nominations

References

External links
 
 Filmography Bollywood Hungama
 Official Website

Indian lyricists
Living people
Hindi-language writers
University of Allahabad alumni
Hindi-language poets
Year of birth missing (living people)